Janet Anne Hoek is a New Zealand academic, she was promoted to full professor at Massey University in 2003 and was appointed full professor at the University of Otago.

Academic career

After a 1996 PhD titled  'Some effects of question wording and question administration on the prediction of voting behaviour'  at the Massey University, Hoek moved to the University of Otago, rising to full professor.

Hoek's research focuses on public-interest issues such as smoke-free policy, and is co-director of Aspire 2025, University of Otago Research Centre whose work aims to support the New Zealand Government's goal of becoming a smoke-free nation by 2025.

During Michaelmas term of 2019 Hoek was a Fellow of the Durham University Institute of Advanced Study, where she was affiliated to Stephenson College.

Selected works 
 Hoek, Janet, and Sandra C. Jones. "Regulation, public health and social marketing: a behaviour change trinity." Journal of Social Marketing 1, no. 1 (2011): 32–44.
 Doyle, Stephanie, Philip Gendall, Luanna H. Meyer, Janet Hoek, Carolyn Tait, Lynanne McKenzie, and Avatar Loorparg. "An investigation of factors associated with student participation in study abroad." Journal of Studies in International Education 14, no. 5 (2010): 471–490.
 Hoek, Janet, Philip Gendall, and Don Esslemont. "Market segmentation: a search for the Holy Grail?." Journal of Marketing Practice: Applied Marketing Science 2, no. 1 (1996): 25–34.
 Hoek, Janet, Philip Gendall, Michelle Jeffcoat, and David Orsman. "Sponsorship and advertising: a comparison of their effects." Journal of Marketing Communications 3, no. 1 (1997): 21–32.
 Lean, M. E. J., J. I. Mann, J. A. Hoek, R. M. Elliot, and G. Schofield. "Translational research." (2008)
 Crow, Dean, and Janet Hoek. "Ambush marketing: A critical review and some practical advice." Marketing Bulletin 14, no. 1 (2003): 1–14.

References

External links
  

Living people
New Zealand women academics
Year of birth missing (living people)
Massey University alumni
Academic staff of the University of Otago
New Zealand marketing people
Fellows of the Institute of Advanced Study (Durham)
New Zealand women writers
Academic staff of the Massey University